Frances Saunders may refer to:

Frances Stonor Saunders (born 1966), British journalist and historian
Frances Saunders (scientist) (born 1954), British scientist

See also
Francis Saunders (1513/14–1585), English politician